Midnight Microblog (Chinese: 午夜微博) is a 2013 Chinese horror film.

Cast
 Danson Tang

References

External links

Chinese horror films
2013 horror films
2013 films